Kuraszków may refer to the following places in Poland:
Kuraszków, Lower Silesian Voivodeship (south-west Poland)
Kuraszków, Łódź Voivodeship (central Poland)